Swapna Sundari ( Dream Girl) is a 1950 Telugu-language fantasy swashbuckler film, produced and directed by Ghantasala Balaramayya under the Pratibha Productions banner. It stars Akkineni Nageswara Rao, Anjali Devi  and music jointly composed by C. R. Subburaman and Ghantasala. The film is based on Kasi Majilee Kathalu and it was simultaneously dubbed in Tamil with the same name.

Plot
Once upon a time a warrior Prabhu (Akkineni Nageswara Rao) one that is making a world tour. Thereupon, Prabhu dreams of a beautiful girl Swapna Sundari and aspires to possess her. Meanwhile, Prabhu gets acquainted with a tribal queen Rani (G. Varalakshmi) who falls for him, but he refuses her love and absconds. After an adventurous journey, Prabhu encounters Swapna Sundari (Anjali Devi) an angel and both of them lands at heaven where the king affirms that humans cannot exist in demigods country. Hence, Swapna Sundari lands to earth to flourish her love with Prabhu when she is seized by a wizard Pittala Rayudu (Mukkamala). Right now, with the help of Pedarasi Pedamma Prabhu finds whereabouts of Swapna Sundari, but unfortunately, he caught hold of Pittala Rayudu. During that plight, Rani arrives in the men's guise and releases Prabhu. In the final combat, Prabhu knocks out Pittala Rayudu when Rani sacrifices her life while guarding Prabhu against harm. Finally, the movie ends on a happy note with the marriage of Prabhu & Swapna Sundari.

Cast
 Akkineni Nageshwara Rao as Prabhu
 Anjali Devi as Swapna Sundari
 Kasturi Siva Rao as Abbi
 Mukkamala as Wizard
 G. Varalakshmi as Rani
 Surabhi Balasaraswati as Maya Pilla

Soundtrack

Music jointly composed by C. R. Subburaman and Ghantasala.

Telugu Songs
Lyrics were written by Samudrala Sr.

Tamil Songs
Lyrics were written by Thanjai N. Ramaiah Dass.

External links

 Swapna Sundari at IMDb.
 Swapna Sundari review at Cinegoer.com
 Swapna Sundari review at Idlebrain.com

1950 films
1950s Telugu-language films
Indian black-and-white films
Films scored by C. R. Subbaraman
Films scored by Ghantasala (musician)
Indian fantasy films
1950s fantasy films